The asor ( ʿasor; from עשר eśer, meaning "ten") was a musical instrument "of ten strings" mentioned in the Bible. There is little agreement on what sort of instrument it was or to what instruments it had similarities.

Biblical references
The word occurs only three times in the Bible, and has not been traced elsewhere. In Psalm 33:2 the reference is to "kinnor, nebel and asor"; in Psalm 92:3, to "nebel and asor"; in Psalm 144 to "nebel-asor".

In the King James Version asor is translated "an instrument of ten strings", with a marginal note "omit" applied to "instrument". In the Septuagint, the word being derived from a root signifying "ten", the Greek is ἐν δεκαχορδῷ or ψαλτήριον δεκάχορδον, in the Vulgate in decachordo psalterio. Each time the word asor is used it follows the word nebel, and probably merely indicates a variant of the nebel, having ten strings instead of the customary twelve assigned to it by Josephus.

Bibliography
 Hermann Mendel and August Reissmann, Musikalisches Conversations-Lexikon, vol. 1 (Berlin, 1881)
 Sir John Stainer, The Music of the Bible, 
 Forkel, Allgemeine Geschichte der Musik, vol.1  (Leipzig, 1788).

See also
 Psaltery

Notes

References
Attribution

String instruments
Lost and extinct musical instruments
Ancient Israel and Judah
Israeli musical instruments
Ancient Hebrew musical instruments

he:כלי נגינה במקרא#נבל